John Cannon  (18 August 1980 – 19 March 2016) was a Canadian rugby union player. He earned 31 caps for Canada between 2001 and 2007, and was a member of the nation's 2003 Rugby World Cup squad. He played professionally in England for Rotherham, Doncaster and Coventry.

References

External links
Statistics at en.espn.co.uk

1980 births
2016 deaths
Canadian rugby union players
Rugby union centres
Canada international rugby union players